Chhinnamasta is a village development committee in Saptari District in the Sagarmatha Zone of south-eastern Nepal. At the time of the 2011 Nepal census it had a population of 10,136 people living in 1,916 individual households.

The goddess Chhinnamasta is popular throughout Nepal and part of India. From the capital of Nepal it is in 482 km east. From Rajbiraj it is in 10 km south.

References

Populated places in Saptari District
Rural municipalities of Nepal established in 2017
Rural municipalities in Madhesh Province